Navajeevanam is a 1949 Indian Tamil-language film directed by K. B. Nagabhushanam. The film featured V. Nagayya, P. Kannamba, Sriram and T. A. Jayalakshmi.

Cast 
The following list is adapted from the database of Film News Anandan.

Male cast
V. Nagayya as Mahadevan
Sriram as Prabhakar
T. R. Ramachandran
L. Narayana Rao
C. V. V. Panthulu
V. T. Kalyanam
Rammohan

Female cast
P. Kannamba
S. Varalakshmi
T. A. Jayalakshmi
Baby Rajamani
Sarojini
Thulasi

Production 
The film was jointly produced by P. Kannamba and her husband K. B. Nagabhushanam under their own banner Raja Rajeswari Films and was directed by K. B. Nagabhushanam. Udayakumar wrote the dialogues. Cinematography was done by C. Ellappa while the editing was done by N. K. Gopal. K. R. Sharma was in charge of art direction. Vembatti Satyam, Anilkumar and Chopra handled the choreography. Still photography was done by L. K. Rao. The film was made at Gemini Studios.

Soundtrack 
The music was composed by S. V. Venkataraman and the lyrics were penned by Kambadasan and Nagai Mani. Singers are S. Varalakshmi, V. Nagayya and T. R. Ramachandran. Playback singers are Ghantasala and T. V. Rathnam among others.

References

External links 

 - a song from the film

Indian multilingual films
Films scored by S. V. Venkatraman
Indian black-and-white films